Jean Stemmet (born 6 June 1986) is a former South African rugby union footballer, who regularly played as an outside centre.

He retired after the 2013 Currie Cup season and took up a teaching post in Kimberley.

References

Living people
1986 births
South African rugby union players
Rugby union centres
Sharks (Currie Cup) players
Rugby union players from Cape Town
Stellenbosch University alumni
Alumni of Paarl Gimnasium
Western Province (rugby union) players
Griquas (rugby union) players